The Gemara (also transliterated Gemarah, or in Yiddish Gemo(r)re;  from Aramaic , from the Semitic root ג-מ-ר gamar, to finish or complete) is the component of the Talmud comprising rabbinical analysis of and commentary on the Mishnah written in 63 books. At first, Gemara was only transmitted orally and was forbidden to be written down; however after the Mishnah was published by Judah the Prince (c. 200 CE), the work was studied exhaustively by generation after generation of rabbis in Babylonia and the Land of Israel. Their discussions were written down in a series of books that became the Gemara, which when combined with the Mishnah constituted the Talmud.

There are two versions of the Gemara. The Jerusalem Talmud (Talmud Yerushalmi), also known as the Palestinian Talmud, was compiled by Jewish scholars of the Land of Israel, primarily of the academies of Tiberias and Caesarea, and was published between about 350–400 CE. The Talmud Bavli (Babylonian Talmud) was published about 500 CE by scholars of Babylonia, primarily of the academies of Sura, Pumbedita, and Nehardea. By convention, a reference to the "Gemara" or "Talmud," without further qualification, refers to the Babylonian version. The main compilers were Ravina and Rav Ashi.

There are six groups of Gemara, namely Zeraim, Moed, Nashim, Nezikin, Kodshim and Taharot. There is a custom made in 1923 by Polish rabbi Meir Shapiro, who saw that there were parts of the Gemara that would never get read, so he started an initiative called Daf Yomi, where people learn a page of Gemara every day for seven years in order that the entire Gemara would be learned.

Gemara and Mishnah

The Gemara and the Mishnah together make up the Talmud. The Talmud thus comprises two components: the Mishnah – the core text; and the Gemara – analysis and commentary which "completes" the Talmud (see Structure of the Talmud).
Maimonides describes the Gemara component as:

The rabbis of the Mishnah are known as Tannaim (sing. Tanna ). The rabbis of the Gemara are referred to as Amoraim (sing. Amora אמורא). The analysis of the Amoraim, recorded as gemara, is thus focused on clarifying the positions, views, and word choice of the Tannaim. 

Because there are two Gemaras, as mentioned above, there are in fact two Talmuds: the Jerusalem Talmud (Hebrew: , "Talmud Yerushalmi"), and the Babylonian Talmud (Hebrew: , "Talmud Bavli"), corresponding to the Jerusalem Gemara and the Babylonian Gemara; both share the same Mishnah. The Gemara is mostly written in Aramaic, the Jerusalem Gemara in Western Aramaic and the Babylonian in Eastern Aramaic, but both contain portions in Hebrew. Sometimes the language changes in the middle of a story.

Origins of the word

The Sugya

The analysis of the Amoraim is generally focused on clarifying the positions, words and views of the Tannaim. Every aspect of the  text is treated as a subject of close investigation. This analysis is aimed at an exhaustive understanding of the  full meaning.

The  thus takes the form of a dialectical exchange (by contrast, the  states concluded legal opinions – and often differences in opinion between the Tannaim. There is little dialogue).

The  records the semantic disagreements between Tannaim and Amoraim. Some of these debates were actually conducted by the Amoraim, though many of them are hypothetically reconstructed by the Talmud's redactors. (Often imputing a view to an earlier authority as to how he may have answered a question: "This is what Rabbi X could have argued ...") Only rarely are debates formally closed.

Argumentation and debate

The distinctive character of the  derives largely from the intricate use of argumentation and debate, described above; 
these "back and forth" analytics are characterized by the Talmudic phrase shakla v'tarya (שקלא וטריא; lit. "taking and throwing"). 
In each , either participant may cite scriptural,  and  proof to build a logical support for their respective opinions. The process of deduction required to derive a conclusion from a prooftext is often logically complex and indirect. "Confronted with a statement on any subject, the Talmudic student will proceed to raise a series of questions before he satisfies himself of having understood its full meaning." This analysis has been described as "mathematical" in approach; Adin Steinsaltz makes the analogy of the Amoraim as scientists investigating the Halakha, where the Tanakh, Mishnah, Tosefta and midrash are the phenomena studied.

Prooftexts
Prooftexts quoted to corroborate or disprove the respective opinions and theories will include:
 verses from the Tanakh: the exact language employed is regarded as significant;
 Beraitot (ברייתות) – uncodified  which are also sources of halakha (lit. outside material; sing.  ברייתא);
 cross-references to other : again to analogous cases or logic.

Questions addressed
The actual debate will usually centre on the following categories:

Language
Why does the  use one word rather than another? If a statement is not clear enough, the  seeks to clarify the  intention.

Logic
Exploring the logical principles underlying the  statements, and showing how different understandings of the  reasons could lead to differences in their practical application. What underlying principle is entailed in a statement of fact or in a specific instance brought as an illustration? If a statement appears obvious, the  seeks the logical reason for its necessity. It seeks to answer under which circumstances a statement is true, and what qualifications are permissible. All statements are examined for internal consistency.
See: List of Talmudic principles and :Category:Talmud concepts and terminology

Legal
Do certain authorities differ or not? If they do, why do they differ? If a principle is presented as a generalization, the  clarifies how much is included; if an exception, how much is excluded.

Biblical exposition
Demonstrating how the  rulings or disputes derive from interpretations of Biblical texts, the  will often ask where in the Torah the  derives a particular law. See Talmudic hermeneutics and Oral Torah #The interplay of the Oral and Written Law.

See also
 
 Hadran (Talmud)
 List of masechtot, chapters, mishnahs and pages in the Talmud
 Oral Torah
 
 
 
 Rabbinic works elaborating the analytical methods employed in :
  - R. Aryeh Leib HaCohen Heller
  and  - R. Moshe Chaim Luzzatto
 Mevo haTalmud - Shmuel HaNagid

Further reading
 "Gemara", Jewish Encyclopedia
 "Gemara", Prof. Eliezer Segal
 "Maimonides introduction to the Mishneh Torah" English translation
 "Mevo ha-Talmud", Samuel ha-Nagid
 "Talmudic Method", Harry Austryn Wolfson
 The Essential Talmud: Thirtieth Anniversary Edition, Adin Steinsaltz (Basic Books, 2006).  Read more here . See also here .
 The Talmud: A Reference Guide, Adin Steinsaltz (Random House, 1996).  Read more here .
 Introduction to The Talmud and Midrash, H.L. Strack and G. Stemberger (Fortress Press, 1992). 
 The Infinite Chain: Torah, Masorah, and Man, Nathan T. Lopes Cardozo (Targum Press Distributed by Philipp Feldheim, 1989).

References

External links
 Point by point summary and discussion of the Gemara
 Gemara Marking System: Keys to Structure 
 Daf-A-Week: A project to study a daf per week
 The Complete Babylonian Talmud (Aramaic/Hebrew) as scanned images of the pages.
 The Complete Babylonian Talmud (Aramaic/Hebrew) as text. (Also available from other sites)
 A printable chart with listings of all Dappim from each Mesechta
 Gemara Brochos:"Shema, Tefillah and Brochos"
 Daily Gemara by Rabbi Eli Mansour
 

 Gemara
Aramaic words and phrases
Oral Torah
Aramaic words and phrases in Jewish prayers and blessings
Sifrei Kodesh